Rafael Fernández Reyes (born 11 March 1897) was a general and Commander-in-chief of the Chilean Army. He took office as commander-in-chief on 9 January 1950 and left on 28 October 1952. He also was a fencer, and competed in the individual sabre competition at the 1924 Summer Olympics.

See also
 List of commanders-in-chief of the Chilean Army

References

External links
 

1897 births
Year of death missing
Chilean Army generals
Chilean male sabre fencers
Olympic fencers of Chile
Fencers at the 1924 Summer Olympics
20th-century Chilean people